Kaplan is a surname that is of ultimately Latin origins. There is also a historically unrelated surname in Turkey.

History

In European languages
Etymologically, the word originates from the Latin term, capellanus or cappellanus, an office given to persons appointed to watch over the sacred cloak (cappa or capella) of St Martin of Tours. Its derivations were then found in many other European languages, including Yiddish, German, English, French, Czech, Polish, Norwegian, Croatian, and Hungarian.

The French form derived from the old Norman French word "caplain", which gave the old French and medieval English word "chapelain", both meaning "charity priest", who was a priest who was endowed to sing Mass daily on behalf of the souls of the dead. Hence the name is an occupational name for a clergyman or perhaps a servant of one. From there the word and name spread. Modern variations on Kaplan include Caplan, Chaplain, Chapling, Caplen, Copland, Kapelan, and Kaplin.

In Turkish
The name is also very popular in Turkey, where the meaning of Kaplan is tiger. When the Turks adopted surnames after Mustafa Kemal Atatürk's surname reform, animals as surnames such as lion (Aslan) and tiger (Kaplan) were very common.

Spread
In German the term Kaplan means chaplain or curate. The word is extant in other languages as well, for example in Polish where the term kapłan translates as priest, in Hungarian 'káplán' means a priest of the royal court or that of an aristocrat; in Norwegian where it also has the meaning of priest while retaining the original, elongated form.

Kaplan or Caplan is also a surname common among Ashkenazi Jews, usually indicating descent from the priestly lineage (the kohanim), similar to the etymological origin of the common Hebrew surname Cohen. One of the earliest modern records of Kaplan as a family name is that of Abraham Kaplan in 1698. Distinguished bearers of the name include the Polish rabbi and philanthropist Nachum ben Usiel Kaplan (1811–1879), the Latvian-born Hebrew poet  (1826–1887) and the Russian-born Zionist workers' leader Eliezer Kaplan (1891–1952), the first minister of finance of the State of Israel.

People named Kaplan

Abraham Kaplan, philosopher
Abraham Kohen Kaplan, writer
Alice Kaplan, American literary critic, translator, historian, and educator
Anatoli Lvovich Kaplan, Russian artist and painter
Andreas Kaplan, German professor of marketing
Anna Kaplan, American politician
Arie Kaplan, writer
Artie Kaplan, American recording artist, songwriter and a session musician
Aryeh Kaplan, rabbi
Avriel Kaplan, former bass singer in the a cappella group Pentatonix 
Avrohom Eliyahu Kaplan, Lithuanian rabbi
Ben Caplan, Canadian folk musician 
Billy Kaplan, fictional superhero from Marvel Comics
Bob Kaplan, Canadian politician
Bruce Eric Kaplan
Cary Kaplan, sports marketer
David Kaplan (radio)
David E. Kaplan (author)
David Kaplan (philosopher)
David L. Kaplan
Dena Kaplan, actress, DJ and singer
Dovid Kaplan, senior lecturer at Ohr Somayach, Jerusalem, popular author and speaker
Edgar Kaplan (1925–1997), American bridge player
Edith Kaplan, lead creator of a neuropsychological test battery
Elaine D. Kaplan, judge
Eliezer Kaplan, Israeli politician 
Fanni Kaplan
Fanny Kaplan (Feiga Haimovna Roytblat), Russian revolutionary and attempted assassin of Lenin
Felix Kaplan (1897–1989), American businessman and politician
Fred Kaplan (biographer)
Fred Kaplan (journalist)
Gabe Kaplan, Actor, comedian, poker player
Gilbert Kaplan (1941–2016), American businessman, journalist and conductor
Gilbert B. Kaplan, American attorney and government official
Gisela Kaplan, Australian sociologist and author
Gregory Kaplan, American historian
Hamit Kaplan, former Turkish wrestler
Harold Irwin Kaplan, American psychiatrist
Harold S. Kaplan, Canadian architect
 Howard Kaplan, American singer better known by his stage name of Howard Kaylan
Hyman Kaplan, fictional character created by Leo Rosten
Ira Kaplan, musician
Irving Kaplan (chemist), MIT professor
James Kaplan
Jeffrey Kaplan, game designer
Jon Kaplan, multiple people
Jonathan Kaplan, American film producer
Jonathan Kaplan, rugby referee
Jozef Kapláň, Slovak association football player
Juliette Kaplan (1939–2019), British actress
Justin Daniel "Joe" Kaplan (1925–2014), American writer and editor
Karel Kaplan, Czech historian
Kivie Kaplan
Kyle Kaplan, American actor
Lance Kaplan, American engineer
Louis Kaplan ("Kid Kaplan"), Russian-born US world champion featherweight Hall of Fame boxer
Marty Kaplan
Mehmet Kaplan, Turkish-born Swedish politician
Melissa Kaplan, musician/singer with Splashdown and Universal Hall Pass
Melvin Kaplan, oboist and founder of the Vermont Mozart Festival
Metin Kaplan
Michael Kaplan, American biologist
Michael Kaplan, American costume designer
Michel Kaplan, French Byzantinist
Mordecai Kaplan, Rabbi, founder of Reconstructionist branch of Judaism
Morton Kaplan
Murat Kaplan
Nachum Kaplan, preacher and philanthropist
Nathan Kaplan, American gangster
Nathan J. Kaplan, American jurist and politician
Nathan O. Kaplan, American biochemist
Neil Kaplan, American voice actor, audiobook narrator, entertainer and comedian 
Nelly Kaplan, writer and film maker
Nomi Kaplan (born 1933), Lithuanian-Canadian photographer and artist
Ori Kaplan, Israeli jazz saxophonist and a music producer
Perrin Kaplan
Philip J. Kaplan
Randall Kaplan, American businessman and investor
Robert D. Kaplan, American journalist
Robert S. Kaplan, business school professor
Ron Kaplan, Israeli Olympic gymnast
Sam Kaplan, author of The Pedagogical State
Sam Kaplan (American football) (1898–1931), American football player
Samuel L. Kaplan (born 1936), American diplomat
Şeydanur Kaplan (born 2000), Turkish female goalball player
Stanley Kaplan, founder of Kaplan, Inc.
Steve Kaplan
Thomas Kaplan (b 1962), American investor and philanthropist
Tomáš Kaplan, Czech footballer
Tomasz Kapłan (born 1984), Polish pool player
Valery Kaplan (born 1943), Soviet speed skater
Viktor Kaplan, inventor of the Kaplan turbine
Yıldız Kaplan, Turkish model and pop singer
Yisrael Mendel Kaplan

See also
Kaplan (disambiguation)

References

Kohenitic surnames
Germanic-language surnames
French-language surnames
German-language surnames
Turkish-language surnames
Yiddish-language surnames
Jewish surnames

cs:Kaplan